The 1980 FIBA Europe Under-18 Championship was an international basketball  competition held in Yugoslavia in 1980.

Final ranking

1. 

2. 

3. 

4. 

5. 

6. 

7. 

8. 

9. 

10. 

11. 

12.

Awards

External links
FIBA Archive

FIBA U18 European Championship
1980–81 in European basketball
1980–81 in Yugoslav basketball
International youth basketball competitions hosted by Yugoslavia